Rosendo Serrano Toledo (born 20 May 1959) is a Mexican politician affiliated with the PRD. As of 2013 he served as Deputy of the LXII Legislature of the Mexican Congress representing Oaxaca.

References

1959 births
Living people
People from Oaxaca
Party of the Democratic Revolution politicians
21st-century Mexican politicians
Deputies of the LXII Legislature of Mexico
Members of the Chamber of Deputies (Mexico) for Oaxaca